The William and Catherine Davern Farm House is an Italianate farmhouse built in 1862 in Saint Paul, Minnesota, United States.  It is one of a small number of surviving farmhouses in Saint Paul. William Davern was a member of the first territorial legislature. The house is listed on the National Register of Historic Places.

References

Houses completed in 1862
Houses in Saint Paul, Minnesota
Houses on the National Register of Historic Places in Minnesota
National Register of Historic Places in Saint Paul, Minnesota
Italianate architecture in Minnesota
1862 establishments in Minnesota